Língshuǐ Li Autonomous County is an autonomous county in Hainan, China. It is one of the six autonomous counties of Hainan with a postal code of 572400, and in 1999 a population of 318,691, largely made up of the Li people. Notably the beautiful Niuling mountain delimits the tropical area of the county. A well-known natural sight, part of the Chinese Riviera is Xiangshuiwan or Perfume bay. Monkey Island, a popular tourist destination located in Lingshui County, is a state-protected nature reserve for macaques. Lingshui is also home to the military base where a U.S. airplane crew were held during the Hainan Island incident in 2001. In September 2010, officials signed and scheduled the construction of the largest sea world theme park in Asia. The Lingshui Li'an Harbor Ocean Theme Park signing ceremony took place at the Narada Resort in Perfume Bay and the opening is planned for 2013.

Climate

See also
 List of administrative divisions of Hainan

References

External links

 

Lingshui Li Autonomous County
Li autonomous counties